Evan Goyke (born November 24, 1982) is an American attorney and academic serving as a member of the Wisconsin State Assembly. He was first elected in 2012 as a Democrat, succeeding fellow Democrat Tamara Grigsby. His father is former state senator Gary Goyke.

Early life and education 
Goyke was born in Neenah, Wisconsin, the son of former state senator Gary Goyke. He earned a Bachelor of Arts in political science from St. John's University and a Juris Doctor from the Marquette University Law School.

Career 
After graduating from law school, Goyke worked as an attorney in the Milwaukee office of the State Public Defender. He also became an Adjunct Assistant Professor at Marquette University Law School, where he has worked on the Milwaukee Street Law Project, in which Marquette second- and third-year law students participate in a weekly seminar; go on to teach an "introduction to law" course at local high schools; and finally conduct a citywide mock trial competition.

When incumbent Grigsby was forced to decline re-nomination in the wake of her cancer problems, this heavily-Democratic district saw an eight-way primary election. Goyke faced a field which included Jarett Fields, an employee of the University of Wisconsin–Milwaukee and brother of Democratic incumbent Jason Fields of the neighboring 11th District, and six others. With 1,637 votes out of 4,399 (more than twice that of Fields, his nearest competitor), he achieved a plurality of 37.2%.

In the November general election, he faced only Libertarian Melba Morris-Page, winning with 16,245 to Morris-Page's 2,133.

References

External links 
Assembly website

College of Saint Benedict and Saint John's University alumni
Marquette University faculty
Marquette University Law School alumni
Democratic Party members of the Wisconsin State Assembly
Politicians from Milwaukee
Public defenders
Wisconsin lawyers
1982 births
Living people
21st-century American politicians
Lawyers from Milwaukee